Longjia railway station is a railway station of the Changchun–Jilin intercity railway. It is located on the basement of the Changchun Longjia International Airport of Changchun, in the Jilin province of China, there are currently high-speed rail connecting the station with Changchun as well as Jilin. It opened on 11 January 2011.

In the future, Changchun Subway Line 9 will serve this station.

References

Railway stations in Changchun
Railway stations in Jilin
Airport railway stations in China
Railway stations in China opened in 2011